The , more often known simply as , is an encyclopaedia on commerce between Europe and the Far East, Africa, and the Americas. It was published anonymously in Amsterdam in 1770 and attributed to Abbot Guillaume Thomas Raynal. It achieved considerable popularity and went through numerous editions. The third edition, published in Geneva in 1780, was censored in France the following year.

The  filled a public need for knowledge in the Age of Enlightenment, answering questions that preoccupied the minds of those in the late 18th century, around the time of the French Revolution.

Content
Raynal's idea was to write a history of European enterprises in the East Indies and the New World, having observed the influence of the great explorations on European civilisation.

The work first discusses the Portuguese and their oriental colonies, going on to give a history of British and French enterprises, then Spanish, Dutch, and other European powers, in the Orient. Next, it turns its attention to all of the various European conquests, losses,  colonies and commerce in the Americas. European commerce with various coastal regions of Africa is discussed, mainly on slavery and particularly trans-Atlantic slave trade. Finally, there is a series of essays on religion, politics, war, commerce, moral philosophy, belles-lettres, and so on.

Style
The  lacks consistency in its style: Raynal limited himself to collecting articles provided by friends and pieces borrowed from existing published texts, without taking the trouble to rework them.

Authors
Although the book was published anonymously, some authors are known, if only in name.

 According to Melchior Grimm, Denis Diderot contributed a large part of the work. He is certainly one of its main contributors, and it is estimated he wrote between a third and a fifth of the book, especially the parts on philosophical themes.
 The nineteenth chapter, summarising doctrine and drawing conclusions, was by Alexandre Deleyre.
 On subjects concerning commerce, Raynal used the writings of Jacques Paulze, d’Aranda and Manuel de Faria e Sousa.
 On philosophical subjects, in addition to Diderot, he used the writings of Paul Henri Thiry d'Holbach, Jacques-André Naigeon and Jean de Pechméja
 He also used work by Abbé Martin, the medical doctor Dubreuil, Valadier, Jean-François de Saint-Lambert, Joseph-Louis Lagrange and Jacques-André Naigeon.

Proud of his work, Raynal sometimes forgot it was only as good as its contributors made it. This can be seen in the pieces supplied by a Dr Sanchez, the author on Portugal and its possessions in the East and West Indies. Pechméja once found Sébastien-Roch Nicolas de Chamfort reading the : "What have you found?", he asked. "I have just been reading an excellent piece, but it finishes with such an awful turn of phrase". "Let me see: you're right. I much think that Raynal writes is nonsense; he has added that phrase, the rest is mine". When Raynal left Paris, Chamford said  ("He is tired of living with his author").

Reception

The  was a great success. In France, over thirty different editions were published between 1770 and 1787, and over fifty were published abroad. Napoleon Bonaparte proclaimed himself a "willing disciple of Raynal" and took the book with him on his Egyptian campaign. Toussaint Louverture read the book and was especially inspired by a passage that predicted slave revolution in the West Indies. Horace Walpole wrote to Marie Du Deffand: "It attacks all governments and all religions!". Anne Robert Jacques Turgot heavily criticized the book in a letter to André Morellet:

In 1780, Raynal produced the third edition of his , which was characterised by bolder and more violent tirades than the previous two, and under his signature at the bottom of his portrait he added the inscription:  ("In defence of humanity, truth, and freedom").

Louis XVI referred the book to the Parlement de Paris for censorship, and also to the Church. It was banned, and burned by the public hangman on 29 May 1781. Declared a public enemy, Raynal was forced to leave France for Prussia, where he stayed the large part of his exile. He was allowed to return to France in 1787, on condition he did not enter Paris.

Today, scholar Jenny Mander notes that there are mixed feelings and overall confusion as to whether  is an anti-colonialist text since there are so many contradictions within the piece itself. On the one side, Raynal makes many statements that are against the overall inhumanity of Europeans and criticizes their seizing of land that is taken solely for European gain and leaves native people vulnerable. For these reasons, some do consider the text to be anti-colonialist. On the other hand, Raynal and his contributors still find slaves and slave labor as essential to the European economy, and they hold their plans for instant emancipation for all slaves. With so many opposing opinions and several other writers who contributed their perspective, reception today is also clearly quite jumbled.

Editions

Current

Available online
 1770: Histoire philosophique et politique des établissemens & du commerce des européens dans les deux Indes], Amsterdam, [s.n.], 1770, 6 octavo volumes, at 
 1773: Atlas portatif pour servir l'intelligence de l'histoire philosophique et politique des établissements et du commerce des Européens dans les deux Indes , Amsterdam, 1773
 1780: Histoire philosophique et politique des établissemens et du commerce des Européens dans les deux Indes, Geneva, J.-L. Pellet, 1780, 4 volumes plus an atlas in quarto, BnF No. FRBNF31182796m
 1783, English translation of the French 3rd edition which was published in 1780: A philosophical and political history of the settlements and trade of the Europeans in the East and West Indies, translated by J. O. Justamond, London, W. Strahan and T. Cadell, 1783, 8 volumes, available (Volume 1, 2, 3, 4, 5, 6, 7, 8) at the Internet Archive.

Further reading
Raynal heavily drew on from several contemporaneous works, including:
 Recherches Philosophiques sur les Américains ("Philosophical Studies of the Americans") by Corneille de Pauw
 L’Homme moral ou, L’homme considéré tant dans l’état de pure nature, que dans la société ("The Moral Man, or, Man Considered in a State of Nature, and in Society") by Pierre-Charles Levesque
 Common Sense by Thomas Paine
 L’Histoire générale des Voyages by Manuel de Faria e Sousa.

Sources

References

External links
  
 A Philosophical and Political History of the Settlements and Trade of the Europeans in the East and West Indies

French encyclopedias
1770 books
Denis Diderot
Books about imperialism
18th-century encyclopedias